The Visual Understanding Environment (VUE) is a free, open-source concept mapping application written in Java.  The application is developed by the Academic Technology group at Tufts University. VUE is licensed under the Educational Community License.  VUE 3.0, the latest release, was funded under a grant from the Andrew W. Mellon Foundation.

The VUE Project
The VUE project at Tufts UIT Academic Technology is focused on creating flexible tools for managing and integrating digital resources in support of teaching, learning and research. VUE provides a flexible visual environment for structuring, presenting, and sharing digital information. Using VUE's concept mapping interface, faculty and students design semantic networks of digital resources drawn from digital libraries, local and remote file systems.

Releases
Tufts University's VUE development team has coordinated releases of the VUE project.  The project's most recent release, VUE 3, has added many new features which distinguish it from traditional concept mapping tools. made by the VUE team on their forums, new features include: tools for dynamic presentation of maps, map merge and analysis tools,
enhanced keyword tagging and search capabilities, support for semantic mapping using ontologies, expanded search of online resources such as Flickr, Yahoo, Twitter, or PubMed.

See also
 List of concept- and mind-mapping software

References

External links
 VUE's website
 VUE User Forums
 VUE on Sourceforge
 VUE community on Ning

Concept- and mind-mapping software programmed in Java
Free diagramming software
Free software programmed in Java (programming language)
Concept mapping software